USS Hippocampus (SP-654) was a yacht leased by the U.S. Navy during World War I.  She was used as a patrol boat along the New England coast.

Built in New York 

Hippocampus, a gasoline-powered yacht, was built by New York Yacht, Launch, & Engine Co. in 1912–1913 and was leased by the Navy from her owner, James F. Porter, of Chicago, Illinois, 21 June 1917. She was commissioned 25 June at Rockland, Maine.

World War I service 
 
Assigned to the 1st Naval District, Hippocampus served as a harbor patrol craft at the harbor entrance, Rockland, Maine, and in Penobscot Bay during World War I.

Post-war disposal 

Post-war Hippocampus was decommissioned 30 November 1918 and returned to her owner 5 April 1919, who was paid $1847.85 for the use of his vessel ($500 for loss of use by the owner, and $1,347.85 for refurbishment to return the craft to its pre-war condition).

References

The Hippocampus is currently owned by Capt. Ellic C. Mottram of Jonesport, ME. She is currently undergoing a full restoration to her original Yacht condition and is expected to be completed by 2016.

External links 
 Hippocampus (American Motor Boat, 1913).

Patrol vessels of the United States Navy
Individual yachts
Ships built in New York City
1913 ships
World War I patrol vessels of the United States